KGAS-FM (104.3 FM "KGAS Radio") is a radio station that broadcasts a country music format. Licensed to Carthage, Texas, United States, the station serves the East Texas area.

History
KGAS-FM first began broadcasting in 1998, having received an initial permit to construct a Class A FM facility on July 9, 1991. The station is currently owned by Wanda Hanszen and Jerry Hanszen, through licensee Hanszen Broadcasting, Inc.

Local broadcasts include live remotes from community events, high school sports broadcasts, church programs, and local news. Local news broadcasts can be heard on weekdays at 6, 7, and 8 a.m., along with a noon broadcast. The station also has an evening news broadcast at 5 p.m. The station was originally an affiliate of "Today's Best Country" from ABC and Cumulus, but in 2014 switched to Westwood One's "Classic Country" format.

Every Sunday from 6 a.m. to noon, KGAS-FM broadcasts gospel music and live church programming.

KGAS-FM was featured in the Richard Linklater movie Bernie, which was released in 2011.

Current and former staff

On-Air Hosts Elaine Etheridge, Ken Carroll, Office Manager Regina Hayes, Assistant Office Manager Annette Ellis, and Sales Manager Judy McNatt

Former on-air personalities include: Blake Holland, Ashli Dansby, Daron McDaniel, Steven Kaine Williams, Reid Kerr, Trevor Bullard, David Jacobs, Eric Jenkins, Alan Mayton and Mark McLain (now at KWRD in Henderson which is also through licensee Hanszen Broadcasting, Inc.)

References 

KGAS Radio Official site. Retrieved on 2008-05-14.

External links 

Country radio stations in the United States
Panola County, Texas
Radio stations established in 1991
GAS-FM
1991 establishments in Texas